Joe Martin (born October 25, 1983 in Palmdale, California) is a former American football linebacker. He played college football at San Diego State University

College career
Martin was a starting outside linebacker both his junior and senior year at San Diego State. During his junior season, he had 81 tackles. As a senior, he recorded 109 tackles.

Pro career
Joe Martin signed with the Baltimore Ravens as a rookie free agent on May 4, 2007 and was released on December 2, 2007.

He was drafted to UFL San Francisco in the UFL's inaugural draft.

References

1983 births
Living people
People from Palmdale, California
Sportspeople from Los Angeles County, California
Players of American football from California
American football linebackers
San Diego State Aztecs football players